The 1963-64 Cypriot First Division championship was abandoned due to civil unrest in Cyprus at that time. Eleven teams participated.

League standings

Results

References 

Cypriot First Division seasons
Cypriot
1